Mayannur is a village in Thrissur District in the state of Kerala, India.

Demographics
 India census, Mayannur had a population of 7,929 with 3,804 males and 4,125 females.

References

External links

Villages in Thrissur district